Wiechers is a surname. Notable people with the name include:

Alfredo Wiechers Pieretti (1881–1964), Puerto Rican architect
Enrique Graue Wiechers (born 1951),  Mexican academic and ophthalmologist
Jim Wiechers (1944–2018), American golfer

See also 
Casa Wiechers-Villaronga, is a Neo-classical style mansion in Ponce, Puerto Rico
Wiechers-Sport, is a German auto racing team